BC Chevakata Vologda is a Russian women's basketball club from Vologda playing in the Russian Premier League. Created in 1995 as Politehnik Vologda, it took its current name the following year after its founders Valentina Cherepanova and Tatiana Karamysheva. Usually ranking between the 5th and 8th positions in the championship, in 2001 it was 3rd and in 2008 it reached the play-off semifinals. Since 2001 it has been a regular in the FIBA Eurocup, reaching the semifinals in 2011 and 2012.

References

Women's basketball teams in Russia
Vologda
Basketball teams established in 1995